Frank Huffman Jr. (May 22, 1915 – September 16, 1980) was an American football tackle and end. A native of Pittsburgh, he attended high school in Fayetteville, West Virginia, and played college football for the Marshall Thundering Herd. He was drafted by the Chicago Cardinals with the 162nd pick in the 1939 NFL Draft and appeared in 28 games for the Cardinals during the 1939, 1940, and 1941 seasons.

References

1915 births
1980 deaths
American football tackles
Chicago Cardinals players
Marshall Thundering Herd football players
Players of American football from Pittsburgh
Players of American football from West Virginia
People from Fayetteville, West Virginia
Woodrow Wilson High School (Beckley, West Virginia) alumni